Latvia – Ukraine relations are foreign relations between Latvia and Ukraine. Until 1991, both countries were part of the Soviet Union and before 1918 part of the Russian Empire. Both countries established diplomatic relations on February 12, 1992.

In January 2022, during the 2021–2022 Russo-Ukrainian crisis, Latvia announced it would send FIM-92 Stinger air defense systems to Ukraine. The air defense systems were delivered in February 2022, shortly before the Russian invasion of Ukraine. Latvia immediately condemned the Russian invasion of Ukraine during its first hours and declared its readiness to accept refugees from Ukraine and suspended the issuance of Latvian visas to Russian citizens.

Resident diplomatic missions
 Latvia has an embassy in Kyiv.
 Ukraine has an embassy in Riga.

See also
 Foreign relations of Latvia
 Foreign relations of Ukraine
 Ukrainians in Latvia
 Latvians in Ukraine

References

External links
 Latvian Ministry of Foreign Affairs about relations with Ukraine
 Latvian embassy in Kyiv
 Ukrainian embassy in Riga

 
Ukraine
Bilateral relations of Ukraine